Voacanga havilandii grows as a small tree up to  high, with a trunk diameter of up to . The bark is pale green to whitish. Its flowers feature a white or cream corolla. Its habitat is lowland forest from sea level to  altitude. V. havilandii is endemic to Borneo.

References

havilandii
Endemic flora of Borneo
Trees of Borneo
Plants described in 1926